Scammerhead is a 2014 Canadian comedy film directed by Dan Zukovic, in which a scam-artist attempts to successfully execute his most elaborate scam to date. The film stars Alex Rocco, Bruce Glover and Dan Zukovic.

Cast 
 Alex Rocco as Ben Sarnus
 Bruce Glover as Wyndham Bawtree
 Dan Zukovic as Silas Breece
 Chris Humphreys as Scrope Jelliver
 Johannah Newmarch as Miss Iceland / Miss Ireland
 Duane Whitaker as Dongren
 Shannon Wilcox as Imby Sarnus
 Alex Zahara as Ian Fragmont
 Garry Chalk as Beldon Fenisher
 C. Ernst Harth as Bruno Tornst
 Kurt Max Runte as Franz Exelmans
 Rick Askew as McCraster  
 Kasey Ryne Mazak as Turra

Production 
A film noir with dark comic elements, Scammerhead was shot over seven years in numerous international locations, including New York City, Chicago, Vancouver, Las Vegas, Los Angeles, Berlin, Tokyo, Havana, London, Rome, Paris, Mexico City, Washington DC, New Orleans, Cleveland, Toronto, Liverpool, Memphis, Dallas, Atlanta, Elba Island and Alcatraz Island. It features one of the final performances by the well-known character actor Alex Rocco.

Awards and honours

References

External links 
 

2014 films
2014 comedy-drama films
2014 comedy films
2010s English-language films